The Porsche Carrera Cup Benelux is the Belgian & Netherlands based Porsche 911 Carrera Cup series for Porsche 911 GT3 Carrera Cup races launched in 2013.

Champions

External links
 Porsche Carrera Cup Benelux Official Website

Porsche Carrera Cup
Sports leagues established in 2013